Charles de Noailles (26 September 1891 in Paris – 28 April 1981), Arthur Anne Marie Charles, Vicomte de Noailles, was a French nobleman and patron of the arts.

Biography 
Charles was born in Paris on 26 September 1891, the son of François Joseph Eugène Napoléon de Noailles and Madeleine Marie Isabelle Dubois de Courval. He married Marie-Laure Bischoffsheim on 9 February 1923 and the couple moved into 11 Place des États-Unis in Paris. Charles' mother gave them a plot in Hyères, for which first Mies van der Rohe and then Le Corbusier was asked to design a house. Ultimately, they asked Robert Mallet-Stevens, who would design Villa Noailles.

Their first daughter, Laure, was born on 8 September 1924. In December 1925, their house in Hyères was finished, and Charles and Marie-Laure would continue to expand Villa Noailles over the years. Natalie, their second daughter, was born 28 December 1925.

According to the memoirs of Alexis de Redé (1922–2004), Marie-Laure was asked: 'Charles, he likes men, or does he like women?' She always replied: "Charles? He likes flowers." In fact he preferred men, as Marie-Laure discovered early in their married life, when she happened to come to his bedroom one afternoon and found him in bed with his good-looking gym instructor. But the incident was not discussed. They lived lives in part separate, in part together, and in many ways as a devoted couple, telephoning and writing to each other every day when they were apart. And even when in the same house, she would write him a letter and push it under his door, and promptly he would reply.

Charles died on 28 April 1981 in Grasse.

Patrons of the arts
Charles and Marie-Laure de Noailles were patrons of the arts.  Their 'hotel' at Place des Etats-Unis was restored in modern style in 1926 by Jean-Michel Franck, and was a focus for a large circle.

In 1929, Charles de Noailles bought the manuscript of The 120 Days of Sodom, the first great work of the Marquis de Sade. His wife Marie-Laure was a direct descendant of de Sade.

Charles financed Man Ray's film Les Mystères du Château de Dé (1929), which centers around Villa Noailles in Hyères. He also financed Jean Cocteau's film Le Sang d'un Poète (1930) and Luis Buñuel and Salvador Dalí's L'Âge d'Or (1930). Charles and his wife appeared in Les Mystères du Château de Dé as well as Le Sang d'un Poète.

In 1929 or 1930, Charles made possible the career of Dali by purchasing in advance a large work for 29,000 francs, thus enabling Dali and Gala to return from Paris to Port Lligat and devote themselves to his art.

The de Noailles had an extensive correspondence with Francis Poulenc and commissioned him on two occasions. He received 25000 Francs for Aubade, which he wrote for one of their balls at Place des États-Unis where it premiered on 18 June 1929. Le Bal Masqué, inspired by Max Jacob's Le Laboratoire Central, was written for a private celebration on 20 April 1932 at the municipal theatre in Hyères.

Gardener
Charles de Noailles was an inveterate gardener. With Roy Lancaster, he published Plantes de jardins méditerranéens, and Camellia sasanqua Vicomte de Noailles was named after him.

Bibliography

References

External links
 

1891 births
1981 deaths
French socialites
French art collectors
French landscape and garden designers
French gardeners
French LGBT people
Viscounts of France
Charles
20th-century LGBT people